The 1969 Kentucky Derby was the 95th running of the Kentucky Derby. The race took place on May 3, 1969, at Churchill Downs in Louisville, Kentucky. It was a beautiful day, the dirt tracked was in excellent condition for the race.

History 
The Kentucky Derby is the longest lasting sports event in the United States. It was first held in 1875 at Churchill Downs. The derby itself came to be by its creator Meriwether Lewis Clark Jr. He came to the idea of the Kentucky Derby from his time in Europe. When Meriwether was there, he happened to watch some horse races at the time and wanted to bring it to America. When he came back, he was able to get the land for Churchill Downs from his uncles. After he developed the track the first race was held on May 17, 1875. There was said to be up to 10 thousand people in attendance to watch the 15 thoroughbred horses race the 1.5-mile race. The winning horse of the first race was Aristides with the jockey being Oliver Lewis. They ran a 2 minute 37.75 second time to win the first Kentucky Derby. Over time since the first race many things have changed from the first derby but the biggest difference to most people would be the change of distance of the race from 1.5 miles to 1.25. This change occurred due to many complaints in the racing community about the race being too long, so the length was later changed in 1896.

Race Description 
Bang they are off to the races. Ocean Roar gets out to the lead with Arts and Letters just on his tail. With Top Knight and Majestic Prince right behind them. Majestic Prince then made a strong move along the outside trying to make a jump up. While the rest of the back was 1 to 2 links back from the front of the pack. Ocean Roar was still holding on strong to his lead by 4 to 5 lengths with Majestic Prince and Arts and Letters just right behind in the race.  With Majestic Prince and Arts of Letter on the inside Top Knight started his run on the outside. The three horses were almost neck to neck with each other, but they were still behind Ocean Roar. Ocean Roar then starts to fall back to the rest of the pack. Majestic Prince is on the inside with Arts of Letters and Ocean Roar right there with him. But here comes Dike making a run on the outside behind Oceans Roar. The first pack is making their run down the backstretch of the track. At this point in the race Traffic Mark starts to make a run on the outside for the front pack. With Majestic Prince, Arts of Letters, and Dike in the front now that Ocean has started to fall behind with Traffic Mark taking his spot in the running. At the 3rd turn Knight is leading by a head with Majestic Prince right on his tail. Majestic Prince is making his Move on the inside with Arts of Letters right the in the middle with Dike on the outside all within a length with the final turn of the race. Arts of Letter pushes through to take the lead at this point with Majestic Prince and Dike right there while Traffic Mark is sticking with the front runner but about a length and a half behind. Coming to an end Majestic Prince and Arts of Letters take a one length lead from the pack. They are neck and neck going into the final leg of the race. Majestic Prince pushes through that last leg and gets a neck length of gap between him and Arts of Letter. That neck length brought home the win for Majestic Prince with Arts of Letters to his neck just behind. To the finish Dike was on Majestic Prince's right on the outside and back just I length from Majestic Prince and right on Arts of Letters tail. The rest of the pack was lengths behind at the time of the top three finishing.

Full results

 Winning Breeder: Leslie Combs II; (KY)

References
History.com Editors. “Kentucky Derby.” HISTORY, 27 March 2018, www.history.com/topics/sports/kentucky-derby.

‌ “Majestic Prince: A Colt Who Lived up to His Name.” Www.americasbestracing.net, www.americasbestracing.net/the-sport/2020-majestic-prince-colt-who-lived-his-name. Accessed 5 December 2021.

‌

1969
Kentucky Derby
Derby
Kentucky
Kentucky Derby